Earl F. Tilly (born November 19, 1934) is an American former politician in the state of Washington. He served the 12th district from 1973 to 1986.

References

Living people
1934 births
Republican Party members of the Washington House of Representatives